Liocrobyla lobata is a moth of the family Gracillariidae. It is known from Japan (Hokkaidō, Honshū and Kyūshū) and Korea.

The wingspan is 6–7 mm.

The larvae feed on Pueraria species, including Pueraria montana. They mine the leaves of their host plant. The mine has the form of a digitate blotch under the epidermis of the upper surface. It is pale green or pale greyish brown.

References

Gracillariinae
Moths of Japan
Moths described in 1960